Agni Paarvai is a 1992 Tamil language crime film directed by P. Madhavan. The film stars Su. Thirunavukkarasar, Nizhalgal Ravi, Saranya Ponvannan, Ramkumar and Anju. It was released on 7 February 1992.

Plot

Raja (Su. Thirunavukkarasar) is an honest police inspector who is transferred to a new department. In his new area, the politician Inbasekharan (Nizhalgal Ravi) controls everything and cannot hesitate to kill those who face him. First, Inbasekhar tries to corrupt Raja but he refuses. In the meantime, Sundar (Ramkumar) falls in love with the minister's daughter Shanthi (Anju). Later, Shanthi takes revenge on the poor man Sundar because he won the college first prize. Sundar is expelled from the college and he becomes an auto-driver. Shanthi develops a soft corner for Sundar while Inbasekharan wants to marry her. Thereafter, Inbasekharan's brother kills Raja's sister. Thus, Raja challenges Inbasekharan to punish him. What transpires later forms the crux of the story.

Cast

Su. Thirunavukkarasar as Inspector Raja
Nizhalgal Ravi as MLA Inbasekharan
Saranya Ponvannan as Seetha
Ramkumar as Sundar
Anju as Shanthi
K. R. Vijaya as Raja's mother
Radha Ravi as Minister Thirumurthy
S. S. Chandran as Devaraj
Chinni Jayanth
Amirtharaj
Disco Shanti
Poorani
Deepta
S. N. Lakshmi
Vasuki as Bhagyalakshmi
Sathyapriya
Baby Sathya
Master Tinku
S. Selvarethinam

Soundtrack

The film score and the soundtrack were composed by Ilaiyaraaja. The soundtrack, released in 1992, features 5 tracks with lyrics written by Vaali, Gangai Amaran, Pulamaipithan and Kuruvikkarambai Shanmugam.

References

1992 films
Films scored by Ilaiyaraaja
1990s Tamil-language films
Films directed by P. Madhavan